Hiroshima Nagasaki One-Minute is the subject of two mural-scale paintings made by Nabil Kanso in 1978–79. One is titled 49-Second (Hiroshima) done in oil on canvas measuring 3 X 5.50 meters (10 X 18 feet), the other 11-Seconds (Nagasaki) oil-on-canvas triptych measuring 3 X 4.60 meters (10 X 14 feet) center, and 2.75 X 1.32 meters (9 X 6 feet) each side.

References

External links
Hiroshima Nagasaki paintings

Modern paintings
War paintings
1978 paintings
1979 paintings
Anti-war paintings
Works about the atomic bombings of Hiroshima and Nagasaki
Series of paintings by Nabil Kanso